Richard Sackville may refer to:

 Sir Richard Sackville (escheator) (died 1566), English administrator and MP for Chichester
Richard Sackville, 3rd Earl of Dorset (1589–1624), Lord Lieutenant of Sussex, first husband of Lady Anne Clifford
Richard Sackville, 5th Earl of Dorset (1622–1677), English politician, Lord Lieutenant of Middlesex, and Sussex
Richard Sackville (by 1501 – 1545 or 1546), MP for Arundel